Duke Ulrich of Württemberg (8 February 14876 November 1550) succeeded his kinsman Eberhard II as Duke of Württemberg in 1498. He was declared of age in 1503. His volatile personality made him infamous, being called the "Swabian Henry VIII" by historians.

Early life

Duke Ulrich was born 8 February 1487 and his mother died in his birth. His father, Henry, Count of Württemberg, was mentally deranged, likely as a result of his three-year imprisonment by Duke Charles the Bold of Burgundy, was banished to Hohenurach Castle in the County of Urach, and his only guardian died when he was nine years of age.

He served the German king, Maximilian I, in the war over the succession to the duchy of Bavaria-Landshut in 1504, receiving some additions to Württemberg as a reward; he accompanied Maximilian on his unfinished journey to Rome in 1508; and he marched with the imperial army into France in 1513. Meanwhile, in Württemberg Ulrich had become very unpopular. His extravagance had led to a large accumulation of debt, and his subjects were irritated by his oppressive methods of raising money. In 1514 an uprising under the name of Poor Conrad broke out, and was only suppressed after Ulrich had made important concessions to the estates in return for financial aid. The duke's relations with the Swabian League, moreover, were very bad, and trouble soon came from another quarter also.

In 1511 Ulrich had married Sabina, a daughter of Albert IV, Duke of Bavaria, and niece of the emperor Maximilian. The marriage was a very unhappy one, and having formed an affection for the wife of a knight named Hans von Hutten, a kinsman of Ulrich von Hutten, the duke killed Hans in 1515 during an altercation. Hutten's friends now joined the other elements of discontent. Fleeing from her husband, Sabina won the support of the emperor and of her brother William IV, Duke of Bavaria, and Ulrich was twice placed under the imperial ban. After the death of Maximilian in January 1519 the Swabian League interfered in the struggle, and Ulrich was driven from Württemberg, which was afterwards sold by the league to Emperor Charles V.

In exile

Ulrich passed some time in Switzerland, France and Germany, occupied with brigand exploits and in service under Francis I of France; but he never lost sight of the possibility of recovering Württemberg and about 1523 he announced his conversion to the reformed faith.  His opportunity came with the outbreak of the German Peasants' War. Posing as the friend of the lower orders and signing himself "Ulrich the peasant", his former oppressions were forgotten and his return was anticipated with joy. Collecting men and money, mainly in France and Switzerland, he invaded Württemberg in February 1525, but the Swiss in his service were recalled owing to the defeat of Francis I of France at Pavia; the peasantry were unable to give him any serious support, and in a few weeks he was again a fugitive.

During his exile Ulrich had formed a friendship with Philip, landgrave of Hesse; and his restoration, undertaken by Philip, is an event of some importance in the political history of the Reformation. In 1526 Philip had declared he was anxious to restore the exiled duke, and about the same time Francis I and Zwingli had intimated their willingness to assist in a general attack upon the Habsburgs. Many difficulties, however, barred the way, and it was 1534 before Philip was prepared to strike.

Restoration
In January of that year Francis I had definitely promised assistance; the Swabian league had just been dissolved; and, after a manifesto had been issued by Ulrich and Philip justifying the proposed undertaking, Württemberg was invaded in April 1534. Charles V and his brother, the German king, Ferdinand I, could send but little assistance to their lieutenants, and on the 13 May the troops of the Habsburgs were completely defeated at Lauffen. In a few weeks Ulrich was restored, and in June 1534 a treaty was negotiated at Kaaden by which he was recognized as duke by Ferdinand, but was to hold Württemberg under Austrian suzerainty. After some hesitation Ulrich yielded to the solicitations of Philip, and signed the treaty in February 1535.

The duke now lost no time in pressing on the teaching of the reformed doctrines of Luther and Zwingli. Many convents and monasteries were destroyed, and extensive seizures of church property formed a welcome addition to his impoverished exchequer (this act was precisely simultaneous with the similar Dissolution of the Monasteries undertaken by King Henry VIII of England). Taxation, however, was so heavy that he soon lost his temporary popularity. In April 1536 he joined the league of Schmalkalden, though he did not assent to some of the schemes of Philip of Hesse for attacking Charles V. In 1546 his troops fought against the emperor during the war of the league of Schmalkalden, but with disastrous results for Württemberg. The duchy was quickly overrun, and the duke compelled to agree to the treaty of Heilbronn in January 1547. By this treaty Charles, ignoring the desire of Ferdinand to depose Ulrich again, allowed him to retain his duchy, but stipulated that he should pay a large sum of money, surrender certain fortresses, and appear as a suppliant before the emperor at Ulm. Having submitted under compulsion to the Interim issued from Augsburg in May 1548, Ulrich died on 6 November 1550 at Tübingen, where he was buried. He left a son, Christopher (1515–1568), who succeeded him.

Ancestors

Citations

References

External links
 Duke Ulrichs victory over the Palatinate in 1504

1487 births
1550 deaths
15th-century dukes of Württemberg
16th-century dukes of Württemberg
People from Haut-Rhin
Converts to Lutheranism from Roman Catholicism
Medieval child monarchs